Wrack may refer to:

 wrack (mathematics), a concept in knot theory
 wrack (seaweed), several species of seaweed
 Wrack, a novel by James Bradley (Australian writer)
 Charlie Wrack (1899–1979), English footballer
 Darren Wrack (born 1976), English footballer
 Matt Wrack (born 1962), British firefighter and trade unionist
 Wrack, the leading broodmare sire in North America in 1935
 Wrack (video game), A first person shooter video game made by Final Boss Entertainment

See also
 Rack (disambiguation)